The Eerste Divisie is the second-highest tier of football in the Netherlands. It is linked with the top-level Eredivisie and with the third-level Tweede Divisie via promotion/relegation systems. It is also known as the Keuken Kampioen Divisie due to sponsorship, while previously it was known as Jupiler League for the same reason.

History
The Eerste Divisie consists of 20 clubs, who play each other in a double round-robin league, with each club playing the other club home and away. Each club plays every other club once in the first half of the season before the league takes a winter break around the Christmas and New Year's holiday season. The second half of the season sees the same fixtures as the first half, with the stadiums changed, although the two halves are not played in the same order.

At the end of each season, the champion and the runner-up of the Eerste Divisie are automatically promoted to the Eredivisie. Seven other clubs enter the Nacompetitie , a promotion/relegation playoff that includes the 16th-placed club in the Eredivisie. The following teams qualify for the Nacompetitie:
The club with the best record in the "first period" of the season (after 8 rounds).
The club with the best record in the "second period" of the season (rounds 9–16).
The club with the best record in the "third period" of the season (rounds 17–24).
The club with the best record in the "fourth period" of the season (rounds 25–32).
The two remaining spots are filled at the season's end by the highest-placed clubs that have not already earned automatic promotion or qualified for the Nacompetitie.

If the club that wins a period has qualified for the Nacompetitie by winning a previous period, its place is filled by the next-best club in that period that has not already qualified. Usually, the clubs that qualify for the Nacompetitie turn out to be the 3rd- through 9th-placed clubs in the final table. Clubs in the Nacompetitie face each other in a knock-out system with the number 16 of the Eredivisie for one place in next season's Eredivisie.

Between seasons 1971–72 and 2008–09 teams could not relegate from the Eerste Divisie. From the 2009–10 season onwards, one team has been relegated from the Eerste Divisie to the Hoofdklasse (then the main amateur league of Dutch football). From the 2010–11 to 2015–16 seasons, the KNVB introduced a third and highest amateur tier called Topklasse, and Hoofdklasse clubs have been able to get promoted to that new division.

Before the 2008–09 season, Hoofdklasse clubs could be promoted by obtaining a professional license. However, only a club going bankrupt or losing its license could result in clubs leaving professional football. The last clubs leaving professional football in that way were FC Wageningen and VCV Zeeland in 1992, and more recently HFC Haarlem and RBC Roosendaal, who went bankrupt in January 2010 and June 2011 respectively. The most recent additions to the league were AGOVV Apeldoorn in 2003 and FC Omniworld in 2005, expanding the league to 19 and later 20 clubs. However, for the 2010–11 season, the league returned to 18 clubs, as HFC Haarlem went bankrupt and FC Oss were relegated to the newly formed Topklasse. The 2012–13 season ended with 16 teams after AGOVV and SC Veendam went bankrupt. Four teams have been added to bring the division back up to 20 teams in 2013. Achilles '29 has been promoted from the Topklasse with the reserve teams of Ajax, FC Twente and PSV being added as well.

Since the 2016–17 season there is optional relegation to the third-tier, amateur Tweede Divisie. Clubs in the Tweede Divisie had to announce in mid-season if they want to be eligible for promotion. Only if one of those clubs won the Tweede Divisie championship is a team relegated from the Eerste Divisie.

The remainder of the 2019–20 season was cancelled amid the coronavirus disease 2019 (COVID-19) pandemic, thus there were no promotions or relegations. Before the cancellation, the KNVB met in December 2019 and ruled that promotion to the second division and relegation to the third were suspended until 2022–23, and that the lowest-ranked Eerste Divisie Jong team will exchange places with its highest-ranked Tweede Divisie counterpart.

Clubs

2021–22 members

Attendance record
Clubs with larger fanbases suffered relegation in the 2000s, with Roda JC setting the Eerste Divisie attendance record at 16,150 during their home game against NEC Nijmegen in the 2014–15 season. NAC Breda bettered it a season later in their home match against Go Ahead Eagles, which had an attendance of 17,800 people.

Champions

1 Blauw Wit, De Volewijckers and DWS merged into FC Amsterdam, which folded in 1982. Reformed as Blauw-Wit Amsterdam, defunct in 2015.
2 Fortuna 54 merged with Sittardia to form FSC, later renamed Fortuna Sittard.
3 ADO merged with Holland Sport into FC Den Haag, later renamed  ADO Den Haag
4 SV SVV (SVV) and Drecht Steden 79 (DS '79) merged into SVV/Dordrecht'90. Now FC Dordrecht.

Playoffs

Promotion

aA Jong (reserve) team can become the champion. But they cannot promote, the direct promotion or the playoff ticket will then be given to the next non-Jong team in the table.

Round 1
Round 1 will be played against lower-ranked teams, in both pools (Pool A or Pool B).
Winner Round 1 will compete in the semi-finals against the number 17th or 16th from the Eredivisie.

Semi-finals
In both pools of the semi-finals, there are two matches played (Match A and Match B).
Match A is the winner of Round 1 against the number 17th or 16th of the Eredivisie.
Match B is against two highly ranked clubs.
Winner of Match A and Match B will go to the finals

Finals
Both pools have their own finals, the finals are played against the winner of Match A and Match B of the semi-finals.
The winner of the finals will go to the Eredivisie.

See also
Eredivisie
KNVB Cup
Johan Cruijff Shield
Football in the Netherlands
Sports league attendances

References

External links
KeukenKampioenDivisie.nl – official website Eerste Divisie 
KNVB.nl – official website KNVB 
 League321.com – Dutch football league tables, records & statistics database 

 
2
1956 establishments in the Netherlands
Sports leagues established in 1956
Neth
Professional sports leagues in the Netherlands